Wirada punctata is a species of comb-footed spider in the family Theridiidae. It is found in Venezuela, Ecuador, and Peru.

References

Theridiidae
Spiders described in 1886
Spiders of South America